Chagdaryne Biambasuren (born 26 January 1953) is a Mongolian archer.

Olympics 

At the 1980 Summer Olympic Games she took part in the women's individual event and
finished 23rd with 2216 points scored.

References

External links 
 Profile on worldarchery.org

1953 births
Living people
Mongolian female archers
Olympic archers of Mongolia
Archers at the 1980 Summer Olympics
20th-century Mongolian women